The Trancão River, formerly called Rio de Sacavém, is a small river in Portugal (about 29 km) from District of Lisbon. Near its mouth, this watercourse can also be called Ribeira de Sacavém ou Vala de Sacavém.

References

Rivers of Portugal
Tributaries of the Tagus